Wheel spikes are pointy protrusions attached to the rims or hubcaps of vehicles, most commonly cars and semi trucks. Most wheel spikes sold are made out of plastic painted to mimic metal, and are meant mostly as novelty items. The safety and legality of wheel spikes has been often questioned, and they may constitute a traffic violation in some jurisdictions.

Overview 
Wheel spikes attached to the hubcaps of semi trucks are essentially stylized versions of plastic lug nut covers, which are meant to offer protection from rusting, and have more common round and flat counterparts. Some wheel spikes applied to cars, known as "swangers," are much larger and longer and are permanently attached to the rims, and usually command much higher prices, from US$4,500 to US$10,000.

Wheel spikes are commonly associated with the post-apocalyptic franchise Mad Max, where many characters have spikes in the wheels of their vehicles, which serve both to attack and defend against other vehicles.

Legality 
Wheel spikes often cause controversy due to their menacing appearance, despite most of them being made out of plastic and being easily removed or broken off. However, they may still cause injuries to pedestrians and cyclists, and may break laws regarding maximum vehicle width. Some private transport companies may prohibit drivers from attaching wheel spikes to the wheels of company-owned vehicles to avoid a negative public image.

Wheel spikes and other "projections on face of wheels" are prohibited in Hawaii since 2016. In the state of Washington, the Revised Code of Washington prohibits "wheel nuts, hub caps or wheel discs [...] which: (a) incorporate winged projections; or (b) constitute a hazard to pedestrians and cyclists." A bill proposed in the New York State Senate in 2015 intended to ban "dangerous wheels," defined as sharp wheel accessories that extend over 2 inches (5.08 centimeters).

See also 
 Scythed chariot – An ancient, military counterpart.

References 

Automotive accessories
Automobile wheels
Novelty items